Dolní Olešnice is a municipality and village in Trutnov District in the Hradec Králové Region of the Czech Republic. It has about 400 inhabitants.

Notable people
Franz Deym (1838–1903), Austrian diplomat

References

Villages in Trutnov District